Massonia pustulata, the blistered massonia, is a species of flowering plant in the family Asparagaceae, subfamily Scilloidiae, native to the Western Cape of South Africa. The stamens are longer than the perianth, giving the flower the appearance of a rounded, spiky brush-head. The deep “pock marks” on the leaves give the plant its common name, as well as the specific epithet pustulata.

In temperate zones it requires protection as it does not survive being frozen. Its small size makes it a suitable subject for a pot under glass.  It has been given the Royal Horticultural Society’s Award of Garden Merit.

References

pustulata
Flora of the Cape Provinces
Taxa named by Nikolaus Joseph von Jacquin